Saint-Lambert may refer to:

People

Saint Lambert of Maastricht - Bishop in the 7th century and Christian saint
Jean François de Saint-Lambert - a French poet

Churches

Germany
St. Lambert's Church, Bergen
St. Lambert's Church, Coesfeld
St. Lamberti, Hildesheim
St. Lamberti Church, Oldenburg

Netherlands
Sint-Lambertuskerk (Maastricht)

Places

Belgium
Place Saint-Lambert, a square in the centre of Liège
Woluwe-Saint-Lambert, a municipality in the Brussels-Capital Region
Lasne-Chapelle-Saint-Lambert a division of the municipality Lasne which contains the church of Saint Lambert

Canada
Saint-Lambert, Quebec
Saint-Lambert (electoral district)
Saint-Lambert (AMT), a railway station in Saint-Lambert, Quebec
St. Lambert Elementary School, a school in Saint-Lambert, Quebec
Champlain College Saint-Lambert, a campus in Saint-Lambert, Quebec
Saint-Lambert, Abitibi-Témiscamingue, Quebec, a municipality in Quebec
Saint-Lambert-de-Lauzon, a parish in Quebec
Saint-Lambert-de-Lauzon Aerodrome, an aerodrome in Saint-Lambert-de-Lauzon, Quebec
St. Lambert High School, alternate name of Chambly Academy in Saint-Lambert, Quebec

France
Saint-Lambert, Calvados, in the Calvados  département 
Saint-Lambert, Yvelines, in the Yvelines  département 
Saint-Lambert-du-Lattay, in the Maine-et-Loire  département 
Saint-Lambert-et-Mont-de-Jeux, in the Ardennes département
Saint-Lambert-la-Potherie, in the Maine-et-Loire  département 
Saint-Lambert-sur-Dive, in the Orne département 
Autréville-Saint-Lambert, in the Meuse département
Canton of Marseille - Saint-Lambert, in the Bouches-du-Rhône département

Miscellaneous
Val Saint Lambert, a Belgian crystal glassware manufacturer founded in 1826